2,3-Butanediol is the organic compound with the formula (CH3CHOH)2.  It is classified as a vic-diol (glycol).  It exists as three stereoisomers, a chiral pair and the meso isomer.  All are colorless liquids.  Applications include precursors to various plastics and pesticides.

Isomerism
Of the three stereoisomers, two are enantiomers (levo- and dextro-2,3-butanediol) and one is a meso compound.  The enantiomeric pair have (2R, 3R) and (2S, 3S) configurations at carbons 2 and 3, while the meso compound has configuration (2R, 3S) or, equivalently, (2S, 3R).

Industrial production and uses
2,3-Butanediol is prepared by hydrolysis of 2,3-epoxybutane:
(CH3CH)2O  +  H2O   →   CH3(CHOH)2CH3
The isomer distribution depends on the stereochemistry of the epoxide.

The meso isomer is used to combine with naphthalene-1,5-diisocyanate.  The resulting polyurethane is called "Vulkollan".

Biological production
The (2R,3R)-stereoisomer of 2,3-butanediol is produced by a variety of microorganisms in a process known as butanediol fermentation. It is found naturally in cocoa butter, in the roots of Ruta graveolens, sweet  corn, and in rotten mussels. It is used in the resolution of carbonyl compounds in gas chromatography.

During World War II research was done towards producing 2,3-butanediol by fermentation in order to produce 1,3-butadiene, the monomer of the polybutadiene used in a leading type of synthetic rubber.  It can be derived from the fermentation of sugarcane molasses.

Fermentative production of 2,3-butanediol from carbohydrates involves a network of biochemical reactions that can be manipulated to maximize production.

2,3-butanediol has been proposed as a rocket fuel that could be created on Mars by means of cyanobacteria and E. coli, shipped from Earth, working on resources available at the surface of Mars.

Reactions 
2,3-Butanediol undergo dehydration to form butanone (methyl ethyl ketone):

(CH3CHOH)2   →   CH3C(O)CH2CH3 +  H2O

It can also undergo deoxydehydration to form butene:

(CH3CHOH)2  + 2 H2 →  C4H8 + 2 H2O

References

Alkanediols
Vicinal diols